Live Scars is a live album by thrash metal band Dark Angel, which was released in 1990. it was recorded at the Country Club live in Reseda, California on April 22, 1989.

Track listing

LP track listing

CD track listing

Credits
Ron Rinehart - Vocals
Eric Meyer - Guitars
Brett Eriksen - Guitars
Mike Gonzalez - Bass
Gene Hoglan - Drums

References

External links
http://www.allmusic.com/album/live-scars-mw0000314967/releases

Dark Angel (band) albums
1990 live albums
Live thrash metal albums